Joshua A. Salomon is Professor of Health Policy at the Stanford University School of Medicine, where he is also director of the Prevention Policy Modeling Lab. He previously served as Professor of Global Health at the Harvard T.H. Chan School of Public Health.

References

External links
Faculty page

Living people
Harvard University alumni
Stanford University School of Medicine faculty
Harvard School of Public Health faculty
American infectious disease physicians
Year of birth missing (living people)